Makiivka;), formerly Dmytriivsk, is an industrial city in Donetsk Oblast in eastern Ukraine, located  east from the capital Donetsk. The two cities are practically a conurbation. Makiivka is a leading metallurgical and coal-mining centre of the Donets Basin, with heavy industry and coking plants supporting the local steel and coal industries. While internationally recognized as part of Ukraine, the city has been under Russian occupation since its capture by Russian forces in 2014.

Subdivisions and local government
Makiivka comprises a total of 5 raions (districts):
Hirnyk — 107,835 inhabitants
Kirov — 52,768 inhabitants
Soviet ( — 53,007 inhabitants
Center-City — 94,93 inhabitants
Red Guard — 81,042 inhabitants

The city municipality of Makiivka includes also the following urban-type settlements (Ukrainian spellings are followed by Russian ones in parenthesis):

The mayor of the city is Oleksandr Maltsev who was born in  Makiivka in 1956.

Demographics 
As of the 2001 Ukrainian census:

Ethnicity
 Russians: 50.8%
 Ukrainians: 45%
 Tatars: 1.1%
 Georgians: 0.3%
 Greeks: 0.3%

History
For a long time Makiivka was thought to have been established in 1777, but recent research shows that it has been mentioned in historical records since approx. 1696.  The first mine was opened in 1875. In 1899 metallurgical settlement was founded nearby called Dmytrievsk, named after Dmitry Ilovaisky, son of count Ilovaysky - the landlord of the region.

Makiivka was only a small village when it was combined with nearby Dmytriivsk. Dmytriivsk subsequently developed as one of the largest coal-mining and industrial centres of the Donets Basin coalfield. In 1931, Dmytriivsk-Makiyivka was renamed Makiivka.

During World War II, the town was under German occupation from 22 October 1941 until 6 September 1943.

Jews in Makiivka
In 1939, the Jewish population of Makiivka was 8,000. In the Operational Situation Report (USSR No. 177) of Nazi German Chief of the Security Police dated from March 6, 1942, it is stated that as a result of the measures carried out by Einsatzkommando 6, both the Horlivka and Makiivka districts had been made "free of Jews". Nazis and Ukrainian collaborators executed a total of 493 people here, among them 80 political agitators, 44 saboteurs and looters, and 369 Jews.

In September 2006, the first synagogue has been consecrated in Makiivka after almost 70 years. The house at 51 Lva Tolstogo street serves not only a synagogue, but also a community center for a Jewish community of Makiivka containing 2,000 members. The chief rabbi of Makiivka is Eliyahu Kremer. Makiivka Jewish community chairman is Alexander-Mikhoel Katz.

Russo-Ukrainian War

During the Russo-Ukrainian War the city town hall was taken over by pro-Russian separatists on 13 April 2014. Since then, Makiivka has been controlled by the self-proclaimed Donetsk People's Republic.

On 1 January 2023, the Makiivka military quarters shelling occurred. It was reported by both Russian and Ukrainian sources that a Ukrainian strike on Russian military forces based at a vocational school in Makiivka resulted in significant casualties, particularly among conscripts. First Deputy Minister of Information of the Donetsk People's Republic Daniil Bezsonov stated that the strike took place at exactly 00:01 Moscow Time and made use of the M142 HIMARS rocket system. Russian officials claimed that at least 25 HIMARS rockets were fired at the school, resulting in at least 15 casualties. Officials of the Donetsk People's Republic stated that the reason for the strike was the use of mobile phones by Russian serviceman at the school, which revealed their location to the Ukrainian military. The Armed Forces of Ukraine announced on the same day that 400 Russian forces had been killed in the strike, with a further 300 wounded, resulting in 700 total casualties. Igor Girkin, the former commander of separatist forces in the Donbas, said about the attack, "the number of dead and wounded runs into many hundreds". This number was, however, also challenged by others; Russian presenter Vladimir Solovyov claimed that while casualties were high, they were not close to 400. An unnamed source in Donetsk told Reuters that fewer than 100 people had died in the attack.

Economy and transport

Industry

There are many coal mines in and around the city. Makiivka's modern industries include one of the largest integrated iron and steel works in Ukraine. There are also other metalworking and coke-chemical plants and factories for pneumatic machinery, shoemaking, and food processing. The city is rather dispersed, with numerous residential communities surrounding individual industrial plants over an extensive area. It is gradually extending to form a single metropolitan area with the nearby city of Donetsk, which lies just a few miles to the southwest. Makiivka is home to the Donbas National Academy of Civil Engineering and Architecture.

The largest enterprises in Makiivka are: State enterprise "Makeyevugol" - open joint-stock company "Makeyevsky Metallurgical Works" - open joint-stock company, "Yasinovsky Coke-chemical Plant", and the limited company "Makeyevcoke".

There are also many machine-building enterprises within the city, with the most significant being: open joint-stock company "Granit", open joint-stock company "Stroymash", and the closed joint-stock company "Makeyevsky Mine's Automatic Machinery plant".

Makiivka metallurgical plant
The Makiivka metallurgical plant produced 1.029 million tons of steel and 825,000 tons of pig iron in 2005. It increased production of rolled steel 1.56-fold to over 700,000 tons in the January–July period of 2006, compared with the corresponding period of last year. It aims to increase its sales revenues to ₴1.265 billion in 2006. The Nucor company (United States) intends to sign a contract with the Makiivka metallurgical plant on delivery of pig iron to the company's enterprises in the United States.

Transport
Makiivka is crossed by several railway lines: one is the Yasynuvata-Krynichna line, and the other is the Mospyno-Makiivka freight line. The city also contained a tram line (since 1925, but there are no tram routes now since 2006) and a trolleybus system (from 1969).

Trolley buses have 4 routes:

 2  City center - Main railway station Makeyevka-Passazhirskaja (Makeyevka Passenger)
 3  City center - Bazhanova settlement
 4  City center - Daki
 5  City center - Gornostayevskaya street.

There are plans to connect trolleybus networks of Donetsk and Makeyevka with direct intercity line to March 2013.

The city has a main passenger station Makiyivka-Pasazhirska, a railway junction Khanzhonkovo (situated in the settlement where Aleksandr Khanzhonkov was born), and minor railway stations: Krynichna, Monakhovo, Makeevka-Gruzovaya as well as a number of railway bays.

Culture

Religion
On the territory of Makiivka there are 22 churches, 73 religious organisations, and a women's monastery.

The city's inhabitants follow different religions, including: 
Ukrainian Orthodox Church - Kyiv Patriarchate — 26 communities; 
Armenian Apostolic Church — 1 community;
Roman-Catholic Church — 1 community; 
Islam — 2 communities; 
Jewish — 1 community; 
Krishna — 1 community; 
Protestant confessions — 41 communities.

Sport
Today, Makiivka has a total of 5 sport stadiums, 4 swimming pools, 90 sport gyms, 15 football fields, 5 children's sport schools, and 36 fitness rooms. There is also a sport school for physically disabled people.

Within the city, 35 different forms of sport are played, and there are a total of 35 sport organisations. There are also many campuses of the oblast's sport schools in Makiivka, including schools for: kickboxing, volleyball, heavy athletics, boxing, some other forms of wrestling, and judo.

Gallery

Notable people 

 Els Aarne (1917–1995) an Estonian composer and pedagogue.
 Stanislav Aseyev (born 1989) a Ukrainian writer and journalist. 
 Volodymyr Bidyovka (born 1981) a politician from the Donetsk region
 Olena Bondarenko (born 1974) Party of Regions politician
 Olha Buslavets (born 1975) a Ukrainian power engineer and civil servant.
 Oleg Fisunenko (1930-2003) a Ukrainian geologist, worked on theoretical stratigraphy and paleobotany 
 Evgeni Gordiets (born 1952) a Soviet surrealist painter.
 Mykola Kapusta (born 1938) Ukrainian journalist and artist-designer who won 70 prizes on the international cartoon contests
 Aleksandr Khanzhonkov (1877–1945) pioneer of Russian cinematograph 
 Vitaliy Khomutynnik (born 1976) a Ukrainian businessman and politician 
 Leonid Klimov (born 1953) a Ukrainian parliamentarian, banker, and politician.
 Pavlo Kyrylenko (born 1986) a Ukrainian prosecutor and politician.
 Tutta Larsen (born 1974) a media personality and TV presenter.
 Oleg Minko (1938—2013) a Ukrainian painter and art teacher
 Pyotr Ryabtsev (1915–1941) Soviet biplane fighter ace,
 Denis Pushilin (born 1981) Head of the Donetsk People's Republic
 Ivan Vasilenko (1895–1966) a Russian Soviet author of children's books.
 Irina Yarovaya (born 1966) Russian political figure
 Vladimir Zakharov (1901–1956) a Soviet and Russian composer and choir conductor.
 Yana Zhdanova (born 1988) a Ukrainian feminist and social activist in Femen

Sport 

 Mykola Holovko (1937–2004) a Ukrainian football player with 294 club caps
 Hennadiy Orbu (born 1970) Ukrainian retired footballer with 270 club caps and 17 for Ukraine 
 Serhiy Popov (born 1971) football player and coach with 388 club caps and 54 for Ukraine 
 Serhiy Romanchuk (born 1982) a Ukrainian strongman and powerlifter. 
 Mariya Ryemyen (born 1987) a Ukrainian 100 metres runner and team bronze medallist at the 2012 Summer Olympics 
 Ravil Safiullin (born 1955) President of the Ukrainian Athletic Federation.
 Olga Savchuk (born 1987) retired Ukrainian tennis player, lives in Nassau, Bahamas.
 Yevhen Seleznyov (born 1985) football player with over 400 club caps and 58 for Ukraine 
 Taras Shelestyuk (born 1985) a welterweight boxer and bronze medallist at the 2012 Summer Olympics
 Eduard Tsykhmeystruk (born 1973) a former footballer with over 400 club caps and 7 for Ukraine
 Yury Vlasov (1935–2021) a Russian heavyweight weightlifter, writer and politician; gold medallist at  the 1960 and silver medallist at the 1964 Summer Olympics; Olympic flag bearer for the Soviet Union at both.

In popular culture
 Titanium Man, (created 1965) the Marvel Comics supervillain of Iron Man universe called Boris Bullski

See also
 Makiivka military quarters shelling, an event on 31 December 2022/1 January 2023 during the 2022 Russian invasion of Ukraine

References

External links

 museum.makeevka.com - Historical Museum of Makiivka 
 makeevka.com - Portal Makiivka 
 union.makeevka.com  - Official site of Makiivka city television 
 city.makeevka.com - Makiivka city site 
 forum.icm.dn.ua  - Makiivka city forum 
 makeevka.h11.ru - Project "Makiiivka: all truth" 
 free.gortransport.info - History of electrical transport in Makiivka 
 infodon.org.ua - History of mining safety in Makiivka 
 pvp.org.ua - News from Makiivka 
 Ukrainian heraldry - Makiivka 
 info.dn.ua - Information about the city 

 
1696 establishments in Russia
Populated places established in 1696
Cities of regional significance in Ukraine
Cities in Donetsk Oblast
Holocaust locations in Ukraine
Don Host Oblast
Donetsk Raion